Mikhail Biryukov may refer to:

 Mikhail Biryukov (footballer, born 1958) (born 1958), retired Soviet and Russian football player
 Mikhail Biryukov (tennis) (1992–2019), junior Russian tennis player
 Mikhail Biryukov (ice hockey) (born 1985), Russian ice hockey goaltender
 Mikhail Biryukov (footballer, born 1987) (born 1987), Russian football player